The Johnson-Wolff House is a historic home in Tampa, Florida. It is located at 6823 South DeSoto Street. On July 24, 1974, it was added to the U.S. National Register of Historic Places.

References

External links
Hillsborough County listings at Florida's Office of Cultural and Historical Programs

Houses in Tampa, Florida
History of Tampa, Florida
Houses on the National Register of Historic Places in Hillsborough County, Florida
Historic American Buildings Survey in Florida